Argyrotaenia heureta is a species of moth of the family Tortricidae. It is found in Guatemala and Puebla, Mexico.

References

Moths described in 1914
heureta
Moths of North America